Orichevsky District is an administrative and municipal district (raion), one of the thirty-nine in Kirov Oblast, Russia. It is located in the center of the oblast. Its administrative center is the urban locality (an urban-type settlement) of Orichi. Population:  32,764 (2002 Census);  The population of Orichi accounts for 25.9% of the district's total population.

Economy and transportation
The Pishchalskoye peat narrow-gauge railway for hauling peat operates in the district.

References

Notes

Sources

Districts of Kirov Oblast